Pheeroan akLaff (born Paul Maddox January 27, 1955) is an American jazz drummer and percussionist. He began playing in his hometown of Detroit, Michigan and Ann Arbor, with R & B keyboardist Travis Biggs, funk keyboardist Nimrod “The Grinder” Lumpkin, The Ebony Set and The Last Days. He moved to New Haven, Connecticut, and formed a group with saxophonist/flautist/percussionist Dwight Andrews. He debuted with saxophonist Bill Barron in 1975, followed by a tenure in Leo Smith's ‘New Dalta Ahkri’ (1977-1979).

akLaff developed a longstanding association with saxophonist and poet Oliver Lake starting in 1975, which included writing for their fusion ensemble, ‘Jump Up’. He recorded with Lake on and off from 1980-1992. His extensive work as a session musician includes collaborations with prominent jazz musicians Geri Allen, Andrew Hill, Cecil Taylor, Anthony Braxton, Don Byron, Julius Hemphill, Henry Threadgill, Mal Waldron, Sonny Sharrock, Anthony Davis and Reggie Workman. In 2006 he co-founded Seed Artists in Brooklyn. In 2009, he reestablished his creative partnership with Wadada Leo Smith after thirty years, and has recorded with him since, including Ten Freedom Summers, a finalist for the Pulitzer Prize for Music in 2013. akLaff currently teaches music at Wesleyan University.

Discography

As leader

 1983: Fits Like a Glove (Gramavision)
 1989: Sonogram (Mu Works)
 1998: Global Mantras (Modern Masters)

As sideman
With Geri Allen
Maroons (Blue Note, 1992)
With Anthony Braxton
Anthony Braxton's Charlie Parker Project 1993 (HatART, 1993, [1995])
Knitting Factory (Piano/Quartet) 1994, Vol. 1 (Leo, 1994)
Knitting Factory (Piano/Quartet) 1994, Vol. 2 (Leo, 1994)
Seven Standards 1995 (Knitting Factory Works, 1995)
With Oliver Lake
Holding Together (Black Saint, 1975) [as Paul Maddox]
Prophet (Black Saint, 1980)
Clevont Fitzhubert (Black Saint, 1981)
Expandable Language (Black Saint, 1984)
Again and Again (Gramavision, 1991)
Zaki (hat ART, 1992)
Virtual Reality (Total Escapism) (Gazell, 1992)
With Henry Threadgill
When Was That? (1982)
Just the Facts and Pass the Bucket (1983)
New Air: Live at Montreal International Jazz Festival (1984)
Subject to Change (1985)
New Air: Air Show No. 1 (1986) with Cassandra Wilson
You Know the Number (1986)
Easily Slip Into Another World (1987)
Makin' a Move (1995)
With Jay Hoggard   
The Right Place (JHVM, 2003)
Something 'Bout Believing (Twinz Records, 1999)
Love Is the Answer (Muse, 1994) 
Riverside Dance (India Navigation), 1985 
Love Survives (Gramavision, 1983 
With Craig Harris
Shelter (JMT 1987)
 Blackout in the Square Root of Soul (JMT, 1988)
With Ray Anderson
What Because (Gramavision, 1989)With Don ByronTuskegee Experiments (1992)
Bug Music (1996)With Anthony Davis
Hidden Voices (India Navigation, 1979) – with James Newton
Variations in Dream-time (India Navigation, 1980)
Episteme (Gramavision, 1981)
Hemispheres (Gramavision, 1983)
With Julius Hemphill
One Atmosphere (2003)
With Uwe Kropinski
First Time in Manhattan (ITM, 1993)With Roscoe MitchellSketches from Bamboo (Moers Music, 1979)With Amina Claudine MyersSong for Mother E (Leo Records, 1979)With Sonny SharrockSeize the Rainbow (Enemy, 1987)
Live in New York (Enemy, 1989)With Wadada Leo SmithSong of Humanity (Kabell, 1977) also released on Kabell Years: 1971–1979 (Tzadik, 2004)
Budding of a Rose (Moers Music, 1979)
Spirit Catcher (Nessa, 1979)
Spiritual Dimensions (Cuneiform, 2009)
Dark Lady of the Sonnets (TUM, 2011)
Heart's Reflections (Cuneiform, 2011)
Ten Freedom Summers (Cuneiform, 2012)
America's National Parks (Cuneiform, 2016)
Najwa (TUM, 2017)With Mal WaldronMy Dear Family (Evidence, 1993)With Reggie Workman
Summit Conference (Postcards, 1993)
With Yōsuke Yamashita
Kurdish Dance (Verve, 1993)
Dazzling Days (Verve, 1993)
Fragments 1999 (Verve, 1999)
Spider (Verve, 1996)

References

External links
 Website

American jazz drummers
Living people
1955 births
Musicians from Detroit
Musicians from New Haven, Connecticut
Wesleyan University faculty
20th-century American drummers
American male drummers
Air (free jazz trio) members
Jazz musicians from Michigan
Jazz musicians from Connecticut
20th-century American male musicians
American male jazz musicians
21st-century American drummers
21st-century American male musicians
Avant-garde jazz drummers